The first series of the British children's television series Tracy Beaker Returns began broadcasting on 8 January 2010 on CBBC and ended on 26 March 2010. Based on the novels by Jacqueline Wilson, the series focuses on older Tracy Beaker, who returns to the Dumping Ground as a care worker. And also focuses the lives of the children living in the fictional children's care home of Elmtree House, nicknamed by them "The Dumping Ground". It consists of thirteen, thirty-minute episodes. It is the sixth series in The Story of Tracy Beaker franchise.

Cast

Main

Guest

Casting

Episodes

References

Series 1
2010 British television seasons